Tom Byers may refer to:

 Tom Byers (professor), professor at Stanford University
 Tom Byers (athlete) (born 1955), distance runner and businessman